Leonard M. Rieser (May 18, 1922 – December 15, 1998) was an American physicist who worked on the Manhattan Project and later for nuclear disarmament. Rieser was a professor of physics and provost at Dartmouth College; he became a highly respected educator and champion of young people and their efforts to build a more peaceful and sustainable world.

A former chair of the Bulletin of the Atomic Scientists Board of Directors (1984–1998), the Bulletin's  Leonard M. Rieser Award for Young Authors bears his name. Starting in 1985, he was the keeper of the Bulletin's symbolic Doomsday Clock and moved its minute hand to indicate how close or far away we were from the threat of nuclear annihilation.

He died in the Dartmouth-Hitchcock Medical Center in New Hampshire at the age of 76.

External links 
 Biography from Dartmouth College
 Leonard M. Riser Fellowship homepage

References

20th-century American physicists
1922 births
1998 deaths
Manhattan Project people